Punta Abreojos Airfield  is integrated by a pair of dirt airstrips located in Punta Abreojos, the Municipality of Mulegé, Baja California Sur state, Mexico.

Punta Abreojos is a fishing town located on the Pacific Ocean coast.

The airstrip is used solely for general aviation purposes, especially for medical and tourist (fishing and surfing) activities.

External links
 AJS at World Airports Codes.
 AJS at Fligh Stats.
 Baja Bush Pilots Forum about AJS.

Airports in Baja California Sur
Mulegé Municipality